Caspian Airlines (Hevapimaii-ye Kaspyen) is an airline headquartered in Tehran, Iran. Established in 1993, it operates services between Tehran and other major cities in Iran and international flights to Armenia, Syria, Turkey, United Arab Emirates and Ukraine. Its main base is Mehrabad International Airport, Tehran.

As of December 2016, Caspian Airlines is prohibited by the US Department of Treasury from engaging in any transaction of any type with foreign entities; for providing support to IRGC elements by transporting personnel and illicit material, including weapons, from Iran to Syria.

History

The airline was established in 1993 and commenced operations in September 1993. It was set up as a joint venture between Iranian and Russian interests.

Caspian Airlines no longer has any Tupolev aircraft; today it operates mainly McDonnell Douglas MD-80 series aircraft.

Caspian Airlines finished building its headquarters in 1993. Later this tower was exchanged with three Tupolev-154s from Mahan Air.

Destinations

Fleet

Current fleet
The Caspian Airlines fleet consisted of the following aircraft as of August 2019:

Former fleet
The airline previously operated the following aircraft:
1 Boeing 737-500, leased from Khors Aircompany

Accidents and incidents
 On 15 July 2009, Caspian Airlines Flight 7908, a Tupolev Tu-154M, traveling from Tehran to Yerevan crashed near the Iranian town of Qazvin, killing all 168 people (153 passengers, 15 crew) on board.
 On 27 January 2020, Caspian Airlines Flight 6936, a McDonnell Douglas MD-83 (registered EP-CPZ) suffered a runway excursion at Bandar Mahshahr Airport, Iran. The aircraft came to a stop on a road, injuring 2 of the 144 passengers and crew on board.
On April 12, 2021, a Caspian Airlines McDonnell Douglas MD-83 performing Flight 6984 from Tehran to Kish rose above its assigned altitude due to an autopilot malfunction. As a result, a Qatar Airways Airbus A350 operating Flight 739, en route from Doha to Los Angeles received a traffic collision avoidance system alert and performed an evasive climb. The Aviation Herald claimed the Qatar jet produced automated warnings about its speed and an impending stall, something Qatar Airways denied. Both aircraft continued to their destinations and landed safely.
On January 5, 2022, Caspian Airlines Flight 6904, a Boeing 737-400 (registration EP-CAP) veered off the runway during landing at Isfahan International Airport following a collapse of the left main landing gear, injuring five of the 116 people on board.

See also
 List of airlines of Iran

References

External links

 Caspian Airlines fleet list

Airlines of Iran
Airlines established in 1993
Iranian brands
Iranian companies established in 1993
Iranian entities subject to the U.S. Department of the Treasury sanctions